Kim Song-ae (born Kim Song-pal; 29 December 1924 – September 2014) was a North Korean politician who served as the first lady of North Korea from 1963 to 1974. She was the second wife of North Korea's founder, Kim Il-sung.

Biography
Born Kim Song-pal on 29 December 1924 in South Pyongan Province, Kim Song-ae began her career as a clerical worker in the Ministry of National Defense where she first met Kim Il-sung in 1948. She was hired to work in his residence as an assistant to Kim Jong-suk, Kim Il-sung's first wife. After Kim Jong-suk's 1949 death, Kim Song-ae began managing Kim Il-sung's household and domestic life. During the Korean War she looked after Kim Jong-il and Kim Kyong-hui. She married Kim Il-sung in 1952, although due to the war no formal ceremony was held. One source indicates Kim Il-sung had had an affair with her even before his first wife died. She gave birth to three sons: Kim Kyong-jin (b. 1951), Kim Pyong-il (b. 1954), and Kim Yong-il (b. 1955).

Kim Song-ae later rose in political power. From the mid 1960s until the mid 1970s, Kim Song-ae allegedly held a significant amount of political influence in North Korea. As her tenure of political significance occurred in about the same period as that of Jiang Qing in China during the Culture Revolution, Jang Jin-sung referred to Kim Song-ae as the "North Korean mirror image of Jiang Qing".

In 1965, she became vice-chairwoman of the Central Committee of the Korean Democratic Women's League (KDWL), and in 1971, she rose to be chairwoman. In December 1972, she became a representative of the People’s Supreme Assembly.

According to Jang Jin-sung, Kim Song-ae had the ambition to place her son, Kim Pyong-il in the position of successor to her spouse Kim Il-sung, rather than his son from his first marriage, Kim Jong-il. In this, she was supposedly supported by a faction of the North Korean political elite, among them her brother Kim Kwang-hop, and Kim Il-sung's younger brother Kim Yong-ju, and opposed by the faction of her stepson Kim Jong-il. In the 1970s, her influence was reportedly seen as excessive by the party, who started to curb it. In parallel, her stepson Kim Jong-il became the designated heir of Kim Il-sung, and his faction worked to remove her from influence. In 1976, Kim Song-ae lost her position as chair of the KDWL, which removed her communication channel to the public and effectively curbed her power base. Reportedly, Kim Song-ae, as well as her brother-in-law Kim Yong-ju, who had supported her plans to place her son in the position of heir instead of Kim Jong-il, was placed in house arrest in 1981 upon the wish of the designated heir Kim Jong-il.

In 1993, she was reinstated by Kim Jong-il as chair of the KDWL, but her position was purely symbolic and nominal, and she was removed a second time in 1998. Since 1998, little information about her has reached the outside world.

There are rumours that she was killed in a car accident in Beijing in June 2001. Other reports claimed she was still alive as of July 2011, though in poor health, and that ambassador Kim Pyong-il returned to Pyongyang from his posting in Poland to visit her. In 2012, a report from a North Korean defector claimed that Kim Song-ae had been declared insane in the early 1990s, even before the death of Kim Il-sung, and since then been kept under supervision of a psychiatric nurse in her house arrest.

She was later reported to have died in 2014, a date which was confirmed by the Southern Ministry of Unification in December 2018.

Awards
 Grand Officer of the National Order of Mali, 18 May 1976
 Order of Kim Il-sung, April 1982
 National Order of the Republic (Burundi)
 Order of the Star of the Romanian Socialist Republic (1st Class)

Works

See also

Pak Chong-ae

Notes

References

1924 births
2014 deaths
Kim dynasty (North Korea)
20th-century North Korean women politicians
20th-century North Korean politicians
Spouses of North Korean national leaders
Workers' Party of Korea politicians
Recipients of the Order of the Star of the Romanian Socialist Republic
Recipients of the Order of Kim Il-sung
Grand Officers of the National Order of Mali
People from South Pyongan